The 1907 New Mexico A&M Aggies football team was an American football team that represented New Mexico College of Agriculture and Mechanical Arts (now known as New Mexico State University) during the 1907 college football season.  In their eighth year under head coach John O. Miller, the Aggies compiled a 3–0 record and outscored opponents by a total of 88 to 6. The team played its home games on College Field, later renamed Miller Field in honor of coach Miller.

The team was undefeated for the third consecutive year.  During the 1905, 1906, and 1907 seasons, the Aggies compiled a 10–0 record under coach Miller.

Schedule

References

New Mexico AandM
New Mexico State Aggies football seasons
College football undefeated seasons
New Mexico AandM Aggies football